Songs of Love and Revolution is the twelfth studio album by English noise rock band The Telescopes. It was released on February 5, 2021, by Tapete Records.

Critical reception
Songs of Love and Revolution was met with "generally favorable" reviews from critics. At Metacritic, which assigns a weighted average rating out of 100 to reviews from mainstream publications, this release received an average score of 80 based on 5 reviews.

Writing for AllMusic, Fred Thomas explained: "Twelfth studio album Songs of Love & Revolution continues the group's fixation with noise-dazzled psychedelic drone rock, but the production is clearer and the songs hit with direct impact. These nine songs are some of the most neatly rendered of the band's post-2010 output, but lose none of their mind-bending effect in the production upgrade. If anything, the album finds the Telescopes delivering their messages of self-discovery and cosmic love louder than ever." Tim Sentz of Beats Per Minute said: "Songs of Love and Revolution, the band’s 12th album, comes after a decade of reinvention and experimentation. All the arrangements on their latest take influence from their 2010s material, but this time around every element coexists with one another, creating a sublime noise bath. Songs of Love and Revolution finds a home, a warm center, that crossroads between shoegaze, noise rock, ambient fuzz, and believe it or not – pop. In fact, this could be Lawrie’s most accessible album to date, and that’s taking into account Hidden Fields closeted pop." In a review for Classic Rock, True Everett gave the release a four out of five stars, describing the album as "hypnotic, breathtaking and quite, quite beautiful."

Track listing

Charts

References

External links
 
 

2021 albums
The Telescopes albums
Tapete Records albums